Kundavada Kere is a lake in Davanagere city, Karnataka state, India.

References

Lakes of Karnataka
Geography of Davanagere district